Barratt Island is a small island lying off the Vestfold Hills, about  west of Bluff Island. It was mapped by Norwegian cartographers from air photos taken by the Lars Christensen Expedition, 1936–37, and was named by the Antarctic Names Committee of Australia for N.R. Barratt, a weather observer at Davis Station in 1960.

See also 
 List of antarctic and sub-antarctic islands

References 

Islands of Princess Elizabeth Land